The Marion County Historical Society is located in Marion, Ohio, United States.  In addition to operating Heritage Hall, a comprehensive museum dedicated to the preservation of Marion County Ohio history, the Society also operates the Rinker-Howser Resource Center, Linn School House and Seiter Cabin sites.

Permanent displays at the museum include:

 Harding Collection on President Warren G. Harding and Florence Kling Harding.
 Marilyn Meseke Collection – Miss America, 1938.
 Prince Imperial, one of the first Percheron horses imported to North America and purchased from Napoleon III by Marion County horse breeder Jacob Houser.
 Mary Ellen Withrow Collection – Treasurer of the United States of America 1994-2000 and the only person to hold the office who represented all three levels of government treasurer offices – local, state and national.
Linn School, a fully restored one-room schoolhouse, was the gift of brothers Oliver Hamilton and Merle Hamilton, who undertook the restoration of the building back to 1905; it was completed in 2004.  Linn School has been recognized by the National Trust for Historic Preservation as one of the outstanding examples of preservation for 2004.

Heritage Hall is also the home of the Wyandot Popcorn Museum, the "only museum in the world dedicated to popcorn and its associated memorabilia."

References

External links 
 Marion County Historical Society, Marion, Ohio
 Wyandot Popcorn Museum, Marion, Ohio

History of Ohio
Museums in Marion County, Ohio
History museums in Ohio
Food museums in the United States
Historical society museums in Ohio
Education museums in the United States
Historical societies in Ohio
Buildings and structures in Marion, Ohio